Alexander Edberg (born 20 January 1991) is a Swedish speedway rider.

Career
Born in Eskilstuna, Edberg took up speedway at the age of fifteen. As well as his home country he has raced in leagues in the United Kingdom, Denmark, Finland and Poland.

In Sweden he has had team places for Hammarby IF with whom he won promotion to the Elitserien in 2010, Ikaros Smederna, Tigrarna and Griparna. His began his British league career with Berwick Bandits in May 2011, replacing the injured Hynek Stichauer, but was himself injured in a crash in July in which he suffered a broken collarbone, a chipped bone in his back, a punctured lung and broken ribs. He returned to the Bandits team in 2012, and was an unused reserve in their Premier League Fours victory that year, but lost his place when they signed Edward Kennett in May 2013, signing for Leicester Lions shortly afterwards. He rode for Fjelsted in Denmark, KMŻ Lublin in Poland, and Keittiöpiste Kuusankoski and Haukat/Royals Lahti in Finland.

References

1991 births
Living people
Swedish speedway riders
Berwick Bandits riders
Leicester Lions riders
People from Eskilstuna
Sportspeople from Södermanland County